Along the Sundown Trail is a 1942 American Western film directed by Sam Newfield and written by Arthur St. Claire. The film stars Bill Boyd, Art Davis, Lee Powell, Julie Duncan, Charles King and Jack Ingram. The film was released on October 10, 1942, by Producers Releasing Corporation.

Cast          
Bill Boyd as Bill Boyd
Art Davis as Art Davis
Lee Powell as Lee Powell
Julie Duncan as Susan Lawrence
Charles King as Big Ben Salter
Jack Ingram as Bart Fleming 
Karl Hackett as Pop Lawrence
John Merton as Jake Phillips
Howard Masters as Joe Lawrence
Kermit Maynard as Curly Morgan

References

External links
 

1942 films
American Western (genre) films
1942 Western (genre) films
Producers Releasing Corporation films
Films directed by Sam Newfield
American black-and-white films
1940s English-language films
1940s American films